Ramón ten Hove (born 3 March 1998) is a Dutch professional footballer who plays as a goalkeeper for the Danish club Esbjerg fB in the Danish 2nd Division.

Professional career
On 13 June 2017, ten Hove signed his first professional contract with Feyenoord. After starting his early career as a backup goalkeeper at Feyenoord, ten Hove joined Dordrecht on loan on 6 July 2019. Ten Hove made his professional debut with Dordrecht in a 2-0 Eerste Divisie loss to NAC Breda on 9 August 2019.

Honours
Feyenoord
Eredivisie: 2016–17
KNVB Cup: 2017–18
Johan Cruyff Shield: 2017, 2018

References

External links
 
 Feyenoord Profile
 Ons Oranje Profile

Living people
1998 births
People from Spijkenisse
Association football goalkeepers
Dutch footballers
Dutch expatriate footballers
Netherlands youth international footballers
Feyenoord players
FC Dordrecht players
Esbjerg fB players
Eredivisie players
Eerste Divisie players
Dutch expatriate sportspeople in Denmark
Expatriate men's footballers in Denmark
Footballers from South Holland